Lumaria petrophora is a species of moth of the family Tortricidae. It is found in the Democratic Republic of Congo and Tanzania.

References

Moths described in 1938
Archipini